Rona de Sus is a commune in Maramureș County, Maramureș, Romania. It is composed of two villages: Coștiui (Rónaszék; Rohnen; Коштіль) and Rona de Sus.

At the 2011 census, 86.4% of inhabitants were Ukrainians, 8.5% Hungarians and 5% Romanians. At the 2002 census, 72.9% were Ukrainian Orthodox, 10.8% stated they belonged to another religion, 8.6% were Roman Catholic and 4.8% Greek-Catholic.

References

Communes in Maramureș County
Localities in Romanian Maramureș
Mining communities in Romania
Ukrainian communities in Romania